The Italian general election of 2022 took place on 25 September 2022.

In Veneto the centre-right coalition (56.3%), this time dominated by the Brothers of Italy, obtained a far larger victory than four years before over the centre-left coalition (23.0%), Action – Italia Viva (8.4%) and the Five Star Movement (5.8%). One third of deputies and senators were elected in single-seat constituencies and, as in 2018, the centre-right won all such constituencies. Among parties, the Brothers of Italy came largely first with 32.7% of the vote, followed by the Democratic Party (16.3%) and Lega (14.5%). The biggest turnaround happened within the centre-right, as Lega lost more than half of the votes obtained in 2018 (–17.7pp) and the Brothers of Italy jumped from 4.2% to virtually eight times that share (+28.5pp).

Results
Chamber of Deputies

Senate

Elections in Veneto
2022 elections in Italy
September 2022 events in Italy